Bhairav Bahadur Thapa (born 17 February 1933) is a Nepalese dance director, choreographer, and scholar. He is considered as the first dance director of Nepal. After retiring from the institute, Thapa opened a dance troupe and continued his choreography work. Hundreds of artists who have taken dance training with him are established in the Nepali art field.

Early life 
Thapa was born on 17 February 1933 (6 Falgun 1989 BS) in Kamal Pokhari, Kathmandu. He grew up in a musical family. Around 2005-6 BS, he travelled to Gorakhpur with his brother there he enlisted in the British army  at the age of 17 after the end of Second World War and was posted in Malay in British Army First Six Battalion. He was known in army as 'Nepali Tarzan', 'Nepali Babu' and 'Dancer'. When he danced whole night during the coronation of Elizabeth II on June 2, 1953, the officers of the battalion were impressed and he was given a holiday for six months. He returned to Nepal on 19 June 1953 (6 Ashadh 2010 BS) and after nine day of his arrival, the playwright Bhim Nidhi Tiwari declared him as a Pratibhashali Kalakar (exemplary performer). On 19 September 1953 (3 Ashoj 2010 BS) he performed for an hour on the Nepal Farmer's Union's annual program.

Establishment of Bhairav Nritya Dal 
On 21 February 1954 he established an organization known as Bhairav Nritya Dal with the support of playwright Balkrishna Sama. He left the army after the establishment of the organization. He created various dance forms and amplified the existing cultural dance forms of Nepal through the organizations such as Machua, Raila, Tappa, Jhayure, Sorathi, etc.

Works 
He has published multiple books. He published a school curriculum book Nepali Nritya Ra Saririk Prabeshika in 2022 BS. In 2030 BS, he published a poetry collection called Dhoka. He has also written two autobiographies-  Hindhda Hindhdai Baneka Tasbir Haru and Bhairav lai Herne Akhaharu. Bhairav lai Herne Akhaharu was published in 2009.

In 2020, Thapa wrote a book about difference forms of dance and the disciplines of Nepali dances known as Nrityakshar Bigyan. The book was shortlisted for Madan Puraskar for the year 2077 BS (2020). The book is being translated into English as Alphabetic Science of Dance and into Hindi by Chetan Karki.

Awards 
In 2021, Thapa was awarded with Jagadamba Shree Puraskar (2077 BS (2020)) for his lifetime contribution to Nepali dance culture, at the age of 89.

See also 

 Bhagi Raj Ingnam
 Shanti Thatal
 Bairagi Kainla

References 

Nepalese scholars
Jagadamba Shree Puraskar winners
Living people
People from Kathmandu
20th-century Nepalese dancers
1933 births